Events in the year 1987 in Norway.

Incumbents 
 Monarch – Olav V
 Prime Minister – Gro Harlem Brundtland (Labour Party)

Events 

 12 February – Oslo Central Station (Oslo S) opens.
 August – the Mosjøen Airport was opened.
 Municipal and county elections are held throughout the country.

Popular culture

Sports

Music

Film

Literature 
Herbjørg Wassmo is awarded the Nordic Council Literature Prize, for Hudløs himmel.

Television

Notable births 
 
18 February – Torstein Horgmo, snowboarder.
27 March – Lene Egeli, model
11 June – Didrik Solli-Tangen, singer.
10 July – Kari Elisabeth Kaski, politician.
18 August – Siri Tollerød, model
21 October – Tonje Brenna, politician.
24 November – Renate Reinsve, actress.

Notable deaths 

5 January – Herman Smith-Johannsen, cross-country skier and supercentenarian (born 1875)
20 January – Tove Pihl, educator and politician (born 1924)
14 February – Einar Wøhni, politician (born 1920)
26 February – Knut Frydenlund, politician and Minister (born 1927)
1 March – Reidar Andreas Lyseth, politician (born 1904)
3 March – Trygve Owren, politician (born 1912)
29 April – Ludvig Olai Botnen, politician (born 1910).
20 May – Otto Carlmar, film producer, writer and actor (born 1902)
20 June – Knut Hoem, politician and Minister (born 1924)
30 June – Torborg Nedreaas, author (born 1906)
30 June – Thor Thorvaldsen, sailor and twice Olympic gold medallist (born 1904)
31 July – Sverre Moen, politician (born 1921)
22 August – Arne Brustad, international soccer player and Olympic bronze medallist (born 1912)
28 August – Gunnar Berg, a national director of the Boy Scouts of America (born 1897)
12 September – Bjørn Erling Ytterhorn, politician (born 1923)
6 October – Roald Jensen, international soccer player (born 1943)
26 October – Bjørge Lillelien, sports journalist and commentator (born 1927)
4 November – Tor Halvorsen, trade unionist, politician and Minister (born 1930)
26 November – Ståle Kyllingstad, sculptor (born 1903).

Full date unknown 
Thomas Offenberg Backer, engineer (born 1892)
Reidar Carlsen, politician and Minister (born 1908)
Finn Isaksen, politician and Minister (born 1924)
Aage Samuelsen, evangelist, singer and composer (born 1919)
Harald Wergeland, physicist (born 1912)

See also

References

External links